The 2016–17 Tunisian Ligue Professionnelle 2 (Tunisian Professional League) season was the 62nd season since Tunisia's independence.

Teams

Group A

AS Kasserine
CS Korba
EGS Gafsa
ES Hammam-Sousse
FC Hammamet
Olympique du Kef
Sporting Ben Arous
Stade Africain Menzel Bourguiba
US Monastir
US Siliana

Group B

AS Ariana
AS Djerba
CO Médenine
CS M'saken
Grombalia Sports
Jendouba Sport
Sfax Railway Sports
Stade Nabeulien
Stade Sportif Sfaxien
Stade Tunisien

Results

Group A

Group A table

Group A result table

Group B

Group B table

Group B result table

Playoffs

Promotion Playoffs

Promotion Playoffs table

Promotion Playoffs result table

Promotion playoff
This game was played between the 6th of Ligue 1 Relegation Group and the 3rd of Ligue 2.

See also
2016–17 Tunisian Ligue Professionnelle 1
2016–17 Tunisian Ligue Professionnelle 3
2016–17 Tunisian Cup

References

External links
 2016–17 Ligue 2 on RSSSF.com
 Fédération Tunisienne de Football

Tunisian Ligue Professionnelle 2 seasons